Gniazdowo may refer to the following places:
Gniazdowo, Masovian Voivodeship (east-central Poland)
Gniazdowo, Pomeranian Voivodeship (north Poland)
Gniazdowo, Warmian-Masurian Voivodeship (north Poland)
Gniazdowo, Goleniów County in West Pomeranian Voivodeship (north-west Poland)
Gniazdowo, Koszalin County in West Pomeranian Voivodeship (north-west Poland)